Holodomor: Voices of Survivors is a 2015 Canadian short documentary film by filmmaker Ariadna Ochrymovych about the 1932–33 Holodomor famine in Soviet Ukraine. The film documents oral history from Ukrainian Canadian survivors of the Holodomor, which is recognized by both Ukraine and Canada as a genocide of the Ukrainian people carried out by the Soviet Union under Joseph Stalin. Ochrymovych conducted over 100 interviews across Canada to produce the film.

The production of the film was supported by the Department of Canadian Heritage, Ukrainian Canadian Congress, Ukrainian Canadian Research and Documentation Centre, Shevchenko Foundation, Ukrainian credit unions, and private donations.

Reception
Holodomor: Voices of Survivors received the Golden Sheaf Award for Best Research at the Yorkton Film Festival in May 2016, after being an official selection at several other festivals.

The film was shown to high school students in Regina, Saskatchewan in May 2016.

References

External links

2015 short documentary films
Canadian short documentary films
Holodomor
2010s Canadian films